Blair Betts (born February 16, 1980) is a Canadian former professional ice hockey centre who played nine seasons in the National Hockey League (NHL) for the Calgary Flames, New York Rangers, and Philadelphia Flyers. Betts was born in Edmonton, Alberta, but grew up in Sherwood Park, Alberta.

Playing career
Betts was drafted by the Calgary Flames in the 1998 NHL Entry Draft in the second round, 33rd overall.

During the 2006–07 season, Betts found success on the Rangers checking fourth line. He was mostly paired with Colton Orr and Ryan Hollweg. Betts was also a key factor on the penalty kill. He was one of the Rangers most consistent faceoff men with 52.3 percent of faceoffs won. He was first on the team with 1,186 faceoffs taken. He was also sixth on the team, first among forwards, with 98 blocked shots and led the team with 276 minutes and 42 seconds of short-handed time on the ice. In the 2008–09 season, Betts served as one of the Rangers' alternate captains while Scott Gomez was injured.

TSN hockey analyst Pierre McGuire declared Betts "the most underrated player in the league". Praise continued for Betts on January 24, 2009, when Larry Brooks, columnist for The New York Post, wrote that Betts and teammate Fredrik Sjöström could be the best penalty kill tandem in Rangers history. As of then, the penalty kill was a franchise high of 87.6 percent.

After becoming a free agent, Betts was invited to the 2009 Philadelphia Flyers training camp. The Flyers signed him to a one-year contract on October 1, 2009. The Flyers later signed Betts to a two-year contract extension on February 12, 2010. On October 5, 2011, The Montreal Canadiens picked Betts up off waivers from the Flyers. However, on October 9, 2011, the Montreal Canadiens cancelled the waiver claim on Betts and returned him to the Philadelphia Flyers, as he had failed his physical. Betts missed the entire  season and subsequently retired after the season.

Career statistics

Regular season and playoffs

International

Awards and honours

References

External links

 

1980 births
Living people
Calgary Flames draft picks
Calgary Flames players
Canadian ice hockey centres
Hartford Wolf Pack players
Ice hockey people from Edmonton
Sportspeople from Sherwood Park
New York Rangers players
Philadelphia Flyers players
Prince George Cougars players
Saint John Flames players